"Game Over" is a song by Tinchy Stryder, released as a promotional single from his third studio album Third Strike. The song features vocals from Example, Giggs, Devlin, Chipmunk, Professor Green and Tinie Tempah, who each have their own verse. It was released on 15 November 2010 via digital download. An official remix featuring Ghetts, Slix, Griminal, Dot Rotten, Fuda Guy, Wretch 32, Roachee, Maxsta & Tinchy Stryder, can be found with a video on YouTube.

Background
The song "Game Over" was composed by Tinchy Stryder and was written by the artists in the song, Example, Giggs, Professor Green, Devlin, Chipmunk and Tinie Tempah. In the behind-the-scenes of the video, it explains how some of the artists got involved with Tinchy Stryder and "Game Over". Professor Green said he was on the Eurostar, and Sam Wrench of Universal Island Records messaged him and asked him to do a verse on "Game Over". At first, Green was unsure of doing it because he was ill and busy. Then twenty minutes later, Green sent back Wrench his verse with BlackBerry Messenger. The song is produced by Eshraque "iSHi" Mughal, credited as "Ishi 2Stripes" (known for producing tracks on Tinie Tempah's album, Disc-Overy). Stryder told AOL Music how the song came about: "My producer played me this beat and straight away I knew it would make a great freestyle track. So I got together everyone that I like right now: Devlin, Professor Green, Giggs... Everyone wrote their bits individually – Pro Green wrote his verse sat on a train somewhere – then we all got together for the video shoot. It was a cool vibe - no egos clashing. We didn't party or anything, we just got the recording done." Example's verse combines elements of his 2009 song "Pirate FM" with new lyrics written for the song. "Pirate FM" lyrics were also recycled into "From Space" and "Skies Don't Lie".

Live performances
The song was performed live at BBC Radio 1Xtra Live and at the MOBO Awards 2010. The song was also performed live at T4 Stars of 2010 with a verse from Skepta instead of Chipmunk and Skepta uses his first verse from his single Rescue Me.

Music video
The official video for the song was released on 1 November 2010 and uploaded to YouTube. It was directed by Adam Powell. It focuses on each of the artists as their verse starts in a grey set.

Chart performance
"Game Over" charted at number 22 in the UK Singles Chart on 21 November 2010. The song stayed in the Top 40 for four weeks (its last position in the Top 40 was number 38), then dropped to number 51 on 19 December 2010. It spent 3 more weeks than his last single "Second Chance" which only had one week in the Top 40, debuting at number 22, then dropped to number 41 the week after. "Game Over" charted purely due to the music video airing on British music channels and wasn't released as a physical and/or a digital single. It could be bought only from the album (released digitally on 15 November).

Certifications

Release history

References

2010 songs
Tinchy Stryder songs
Songs with music by Tinchy Stryder
Chipmunk (rapper) songs
Example (musician) songs
Devlin (rapper) songs
Tinie Tempah songs
Giggs (rapper) songs
Professor Green songs
Takeover Entertainment singles
Songs written by Professor Green
Songs written by Example (musician)
Songs written by Tinie Tempah
Songs written by Eshraque "iSHi" Mughal
Songs written by Giggs (rapper)
Music videos directed by Adam Powell